Between 1873 and 1945, Saranac Lake, New York, became a world-renowned center for the treatment of tuberculosis, using a treatment that involved exposing patients to as much fresh air as possible under conditions of complete bed-rest. In the process, a specific building type, the "cure cottage", developed, built by residents seeking to capitalize on the town's fame, by physicians, and often by the patients themselves. Many of these structures are extant, and their historic value has been recognized by listing on The National Register of Historic Places.

Beginnings
Dr. Edward Livingston Trudeau (1848–1915), as a young man, watched his elder brother die of tuberculosis over a period of three months– at the time, the disease was incurable. He subsequently trained as a doctor, and, three years after completing his studies, was himself diagnosed with tuberculosis. Conventional thinking of the time called for a change of climate, and he went to live in the Adirondack Mountains, initially at Paul Smith's Hotel, spending as much time as possible in the open, and he subsequently regained his health. In 1876 he moved to Saranac Lake and established a medical practice among the sportsmen, guides and lumber camps of the region. In 1882, Trudeau read about Prussian Dr. Hermann Brehmer's success treating tuberculosis with the "rest cure" in cold, clear mountain air. Following this example, Trudeau founded the Adirondack Cottage Sanitarium in February, 1885. The first patients were two sisters who had been factory workers in New York City. They were treated in a one-room cottage named "Little Red", built for $350 on land donated by the guides and residents of the village. As the sanitorium grew, it would be supported at first by wealthy sportsmen that Trudeau had met at Paul Smith's, several of whom had built great camps on the nearby St. Regis Lakes.

The requirement for fresh air lead Trudeau to avoid large institutional settings, feeling that a cottage-like structure would maximize the patient's exposure to light and air, and avoid the sanitation difficulties of a large institutional setting. Consequently, as the town's increasing fame drew more and more invalids, "cure cottages" began to spring up throughout the town. Many were created by simply adding glassed-in porches to existing houses. Others were built as cure cottages and/or apartment buildings, but all had "cure porches" with sliding glass windows, in which patients spent at least eight hours a day resting on special day beds or reclining chairs.

Growth
In 1887, when Robert Louis Stevenson came to Saranac Lake for treatment of what was then thought to be tuberculosis and stayed at what is now known as Stevenson Cottage, the town's fame grew substantially, and the arrival of the railroads, the New York Central and the Delaware and Hudson, in the village greatly eased access to the area. The discovery that tuberculosis was contagious further contributed to Saranac Lake's importance as a cure center, as many other venues in the Adirondacks began to turn "consumptives" away. As a result, the village grew rapidly, from 533 in 1880 to 1582 in 1890 to a peak of more than 6,000 by 1920.

Many who came to take the cure brought talents that were put to good use in the small town.  William L. Coulter, for example, was an architect who found work designing cottages for wealthy clients, often to be used as cure cottages. He designed a house at 147 Park Avenue for Thomas Bailey Aldrich editor of the Atlantic Monthly in 1903 that wits dubbed "The Porcupine" because it had so many fine points. He also designed Camp Eagle Island and Prospect Point Camp, two Great Camps on Upper Saranac Lake.

A number of different types of institutions developed: boarding houses and cottages, for relatively ambulatory patients; cottages that didn't provide board, in which case meals would be provided by a nearby boarding cottage; "nursing cottages" for patients too weak to get around. In time, cottages came to specialize in distinct populations: there were cottages for Greeks, for Cubans, for blacks, and kosher boarding cottages for Jews. Some were organized by occupation: there were cottages that catered to circus people, for telephone workers, for the employees of the DuPont company, and for Endicott Johnson Shoes. The National Vaudeville Artists built the National Vaudeville Artists Hospital, which later became the Will Rogers Memorial Hospital, now a senior independent living community, Saranac Village at Will Rogers.

For those who could afford it, the best situation for a patient was to be able to live with one's own family. For these, a number of possibilities existed, ranging from a small cottage that could house the entire family, to large and luxurious houses built to accommodate the family and whatever patients might be part of it. One of the latter type was built for a Swiss baron for his invalid daughter, another by the founder of Stanley Tools. Those of lesser means frequently brought family members who earned a living by working in other sanatoria, or creating their own cure settings in rented accommodations.

During the World Wars
World War I caused another major increase in patients— the stress of war and the damage caused by mustard gas provided fertile ground for the tuberculosis bacillus. By 1921 there were 650 veterans living in Saranac Lake; later, the Veterans Administration opened Sunmount Veterans Hospital in nearby Tupper Lake.

When Norway was overrun by the Nazis early in World War II, many Norwegian merchant seamen who were at sea at the time chose to come to the United States; some of those were found to have tuberculosis, and perhaps as many as 500 came to live in Saranac Lake. They nearly all left after the war, but 16 had died, and are buried in a special section of Pine Ridge Cemetery; their graves are tended by prisoners at nearby Camp Gabriels, funded by an annual payment from the Norwegian government.

New treatments and cottage reuse
In 1944, an effective drug, streptomycin, was developed, and by the mid-1950s, sanatorium treatment of tuberculosis was nearly entirely supplanted by drug treatment, although the New York state-operated tuberculosis sanatorium in nearby Ray Brook (started in 1904) was not closed until the mid-1960s. Many of the cure cottages were converted into apartment houses, and some were torn down; some have been lovingly restored, and some badly renovated.

Notable residents
Thomas Bailey Aldrich
Adelaide Crapsey
Christy Mathewson
William Morris
Manuel L. Quezon

The National Register of Historic Places sites

Sixty-four of the hundreds of cure cottages still extant in Saranac Lake have been placed on the National Register of Historic Places.  Still more are included in seven historic districts in the village.

Notes

Sources

Gallos, Philip L., Cure Cottages of Saranac Lake, Historic Saranac Lake, 1985, .

External links
AdirondackHistory.org: "Tuberculosis: Curing in the Adirondacks"
History of the National Vaudeville Artists' Will Rogers Hospital
This Was Heaven, Really A 12-minute video about curing in Saranac Lake

Adirondacks
Tuberculosis sanatoria in the United States
Residential buildings on the National Register of Historic Places in New York (state)
Houses in Franklin County, New York
Houses in Essex County, New York
Historic districts on the National Register of Historic Places in New York (state)
National Register of Historic Places in Essex County, New York
National Register of Historic Places in Franklin County, New York
Saranac Lake, New York